Sruby is a municipality and village in Ústí nad Orlicí District in the Pardubice Region of the Czech Republic. It has about 600 inhabitants.

Administrative parts
The village of Hluboká is an administrative part of Sruby.

References

Villages in Ústí nad Orlicí District